Euryodendron is a genus of plant in family Pentaphylacaceae. The genus currently contains a single species, Euryodendron excelsum. It is endemic to China. It is threatened by habitat loss.

A 2017 survey carried out in Guangdong Province found the species close to extinction, with only 76 trees left. A further 300 trees have been planted in an attempt to save the species.

References

Pentaphylacaceae
Monotypic Ericales genera
Taxonomy articles created by Polbot